William Bruce "Bill" Overstreet Jr. (April 10, 1921 – December 29, 2013) was an American fighter pilot and a veteran of the 357th Fighter Group, 363rd Fighter Squadron of the United States Army Air Forces during World War II. He is best known for his solo pursuit of a German Messerschmitt Bf 109G underneath the arches of the Eiffel Tower in 1944. This engagement occurred on an unknown date in the spring of 1944, Bill Overstreet and his P-51B Mustang ("Berlin Express") were a half hour away from Paris when the action started.

German fighters attacked the American bomber group Overstreet was escorting. After most of the Germans had broken off their attack, Overstreet and a Bf 109 began a running dogfight. With Overstreet behind him, the Bf 109 pilot flew over Paris, hoping that the heavy German anti-aircraft batteries surrounding the city would either shoot Overstreet down or force him to disengage. However, Overstreet stayed on his quarry's tail, despite the intense enemy ground fire. Overstreet managed to get some hits at about 1500 feet, damaging the engine. In a surprise maneuver, the German pilot flew beneath the Eiffel Tower. Undeterred, Overstreet followed, scoring several more hits in the process. The German plane crashed, and Overstreet escaped the heavy flak around Paris by flying low and full throttle down the Seine until he had cleared the heavily defended city's anti-aircraft batteries.

The scene of Overstreet chasing and downing the enemy plane inspired French citizens and the Resistance. He was awarded France's highest military award, the Legion of Honour, by French Ambassador to the United States Pierre Vimont at a ceremony held at the National D-Day Memorial in Bedford, Virginia, on June 6, 2009.

Overstreet died on December 29, 2013, at the age of 92.

References

External links 

Bill Overstreet Records, c1940s, Profiles of Honor Digital Collection, Library of Virginia.

1921 births
2013 deaths
Recipients of the Legion of Honour
United States Army Air Forces pilots of World War II
People from Clifton Forge, Virginia